The Siam Weekly Monitor was an English-language weekly newspaper whose first issue was published in Thailand on 22 May 1867. The American national E. D'Encourt was its editor, proprietor and editor until it ceased publication on 29 August 1868.

See also 
Timeline of English-language newspapers published in Thailand
List of online newspaper archives - Thailand

References 

Defunct newspapers published in Thailand
English-language newspapers published in Asia
English-language newspapers published in Thailand
Mass media in Bangkok